Thompson Road may refer to:

New York State Route 635
Thompson Road, Melbourne, Australia